Brit Awards 2013  was held on 20 February 2013. This was the 33rd edition of the British Phonographic Industry's annual Brit Awards. The awards ceremony was held at The O2 Arena in London, and was presented for the third time in three years by James Corden.

Leading the nominations were Mumford & Sons and Emeli Sandé with four nominations each, but Sandé and Ben Howard ended up as the most successful winners, with two awards each.

The statue for 2013 was designed by Damien Hirst. Coverage on ITV attracted more than 6.5 million viewers, with a peak of 7.5 million, the biggest audience for the awards in ten years.

Performances

Winners and nominees

The nominations were announced on 10 January 2013 during the 2013 BRIT Awards Launch at the Savoy Hotel in London. The event was hosted by Nick Grimshaw

Multiple nominations and awards

References

External links
Brit Awards 2013 at Brits.co.uk

Brit Awards
Brit Awards
BRIT awards
Brit
Brit
Brit Awards